Natasha Shanta Reid (born May 31, 1981), better known by her Korean name Yoon Mi-rae, often stylized as Yoonmirae, is an American-born South Korean-based solo rapper, singer, songwriter, and producer, who is also a member of Korean hip hop trio MFBTY.

Biography

Early life and education
Yoon was born on May 31, 1981, in Fort Hood, Texas to a South Korean mother and an African-American father. Her father had been a radio DJ while serving with the U.S. military in South Korea in the district of Uijeongbu. Yoon's father cites his record collection as an influence to pursue her music career. After she moved to South Korea as a child, she often faced discrimination because of her mixed heritage. Yoon dropped out of school at age 15 and later took a high school equivalence exam.

Discovery, Uptown and Tashannie
Yoon was discovered in 1995 when she accompanied a friend to an audition for a new Korean hip hop group. She did not audition herself, but a World Records representative heard her singing outside of the audition room and signed her to join a new group called Uptown. The group debuted in 1997, when Yoon was 16.

In 1999, she also formed hip hop and R&B duo "Tashannie" with rapper Lee Soo-a, stage name "Annie". They released one album, called Parallel Prophecies. Yoon's name, Natasha, was hard for South Koreans to pronounce, so she used the name "Tasha," in order to better appeal to the intended audience.

Uptown broke up in 2000 after several group members were arrested on drug charges. Yoon's then-boyfriend, rapper Tiger JK, was also arrested and spent a month and a half in jail. Yoon herself went into hiding during that period.

Solo career and MFBTY
Yoon debuted as a solo artist in 2001, under the moniker "T" which she shortened even more from "Tasha". She released her first album, As Time Goes By that same year. Her second album, Gemini and her third album, To My Love, were released the following year in 2002.

In 2006, she joined Jungle Entertainment, a label founded by her now-husband Tiger JK. The following year, she released the album T3 – Yoon Mi Rae, on which she shared the difficulties she faced as a mixed race artist in Korea. That year, she performed in Seoul, South Korea with American singer Amerie, who is also of African-American and Korean heritage.

In 2012, Yoon became the face of the computer brand Hewlett-Packard in Korea, having signed a one-year contract to appear in their print media and radio advertisements. She was also a judge on the third and fourth seasons of the television talent competition Superstar K.

Yoon, Tiger JK and rapper Bizzy, formed the hip hop trio MFBTY (My Fans Better Than Yours) in 2013. The group's first single, "Sweet Dream," ranked #1 on three Korean music charts shortly after its release. They had debuted the song at a concert in Cannes, France. MFBTY signed to Tiger JK's newly created Feel Ghood Music label later that year.

In September 2013, Yoon earned the #1 spot on Billboard's Korea K-Pop Hot 100 list with her song "Touch Love" from the South Korean drama Master's Sun.

In December 2014, Yoon released the single "Angel," which quickly became #1 on four Korean music charts. Also that month she revealed that the American film The Interview used her song "Pay Day" without permission, and that she was taking legal action.

Personal life
In June 2007, she married Tiger JK in a private ceremony in a Buddhist Temple. The wedding occurred a month before the death of Tiger JK's grandmother who had wanted to see them wed before her passing. Yoon gave birth to their son Jordan Seo in March 2008.

Yoon and her husband are advocates against child abuse. In 2011, they appeared in a photoshoot with their son in Vogue Korea for the "Stop Child Abuse & Love Children" campaign. They also filmed a public service announcement for the World Day for the Prevention of Child Abuse, performing at the 2011 Child Abuse Awareness Concert. In 2012, South Korea's Ministry of Health and Welfare commended the couple for their efforts in promoting child abuse prevention.

Yoon has also promoted awareness of multiculturalism within Korean families. In 2008, she volunteered for seven months at a multicultural youth camp.

Discography

Studio albums

Collaborative albums

Compilation albums

Singles

Soundtrack appearances

Television appearances
 2018: The Fan - Fan (Episode 1)
 2016: Fantastic Duo – Contestant (Episode 17-20)
 2011: Superstar K3 – Judge

Awards

MelOn Music Awards

|-
|align="center"|2013
|align="center"|Yoon Mi-rae
|align="center"|Best Original Soundtrack
|
|}

Mnet Asian Music Awards

|-
|align="center"|2007
|align="center"|"Have You Forgotten?"
|align="center"|Best R&B Performance
|
|-
|align="center"|2013
|align="center"|"Touch Love"
|align="center" rowspan=2|Best Original Soundtrack
|
|-
|align="center"|2014
|align="center"|"I Love You"
|
|}

Notes

References

External links

 

1981 births
Living people
20th-century South Korean women singers
21st-century South Korean women singers
American emigrants to South Korea
American musicians of Korean descent
Uptown (band) members
Jungle Entertainment artists
Korean Music Award winners
MAMA Award winners
South Korean women rappers
South Korean hip hop singers
South Korean female idols
South Korean people of African-American descent
South Korean rhythm and blues singers
Southern hip hop musicians
Melon Music Award winners